The 2016 Tour de Corse (formally the 59ème Tour de Corse) was the tenth round of the 2016 World Rally Championship. The race was held over four days between 30 September and 2 October 2016, and was based in Bastia, Corsica, France. Volkswagen's Sébastien Ogier won the race, his 36th win in the World Rally Championship.

Entry list

Overall standings

Special stages

Power Stage

References

Corse, Tour de
Tour de Corse
Corse, Tour de